Synandrodaphne is a genus of flowering plants belonging to the family Thymelaeaceae.

Its native range is Western Central Tropical Africa.

Species:

Synandrodaphne paradoxa

References

Thymelaeaceae
Malvales genera